Anastas Jovanović (1817 – 1 November 1899) was a Serbian photographer and author.

Biography
Jovanović, was of Bulgarian origin and during his life he always felt himself a Bulgarian and at the same time a Serb. He was born in Vratsa, an important administrative and garrison city under Ottoman rule in 1817. When Anastas was 9 years old, his father sent him to continue his education in Belgrade, where his uncle worked at the Prince Obrenović sewing studio. In 1830, after the death of Anastas' father, his family moved to Belgrade. But only after one year his uncle who was their support died too. 

Anastas' son Konstantin Jovanović (1849–1923) was a prominent architect. Anastas's daughter Katarina Jovanović was a prominent Serbian to German translator.

He was awarded the Order of Prince Danilo I.

Gallery

References

External links
Examples and Overview
 Biography

Serbian photographers
19th-century Serbian artists
1817 births
1899 deaths
People from Vratsa
Bulgarian emigrants to Serbia
Academy of Fine Arts Vienna alumni